The Ford Panther platform was an automobile platform that was used by Ford Motor Company from the 1979 to 2012 model years.  Following the downsizing of the General Motors B-bodies and C-bodies by two years, the Panther platform marked the end of production of sedans unencumbered by downsizing.  Originally slated for discontinuation during the early 1980s, the Panther architecture was used for 33 model years, the longest-produced platform in North American automotive history.

Developed as a successor to the 1969 Ford chassis, the rear-wheel drive, body-on-frame Panther platform was used by the Ford and Lincoln-Mercury brands.  While produced exclusively as four-door sedans from 1992 to 2012, prior to its first update, the chassis underpinned two-door sedans and five-door station wagons.  Throughout its entire production life, all Panther-platform vehicles were equipped with a V8 engine; the Modular V8 engine was the first overhead-cam V8 engine used in an assembly line manufactured production American vehicle.

Initially developed in response to the implementation of CAFE by the U.S. federal government, the Panther platform outlived its closest rival (the GM B platform) by 15 years, with the 2012 Ford Crown Victoria becoming the final mass-produced passenger car designed with a separate frame.  While body-on-frame construction is retained by pickup trucks and larger SUVs, unibody construction (or variants thereof) see nearly universal use in passenger cars.

From 1978 to 1985, Ford and Mercury versions of the Panther platform were assembled in Hazelwood, Missouri (St. Louis Assembly).  For the 1986 model year, production shifted to Talbotville, Ontario, Canada (St. Thomas Assembly) for the 1986 model year.  Lincoln versions were sourced from Wixom, Michigan (Wixom Assembly) until its 2007 closure; from 2008 to 2011, the Lincoln Town Car was assembled by St. Thomas Assembly. After a short production run of 2012 vehicles for export, St. Thomas Assembly produced the final Ford Crown Victoria on 15 September 2011, the final vehicle produced by the facility and the final vehicle of the Panther platform.

Design overview
The Panther platform utilized the body-on-frame construction with live rear axle suspension. While commonplace during its late-1970s introduction, it is a design found almost exclusively in large SUVs and pickup trucks today. The durability resulting from the body on frame construction (which allows easier repair after minor collisions), and their relatively simple design make the Panther cars appealing as fleet vehicles, including police cars and taxicabs. The Lincoln Town Car appealed largely to livery services, and was the most commonly used limousine in North America, due to its ability to be easily "stretched" by lengthening the frame without compromising chassis strength.

Although introduced in 1978, the Panther platform underwent major changes along the way. Across its design life it was produced in three distinct generations:

First generation (1979–1991): This generation was the only one to be produced in three body styles: four-door sedan, two-door coupe, and five-door station wagon. This was the only generation to use the Windsor V8 engine.
Second generation (1990–2002): Extensive redesigns of exterior and interior; introduction of Modular V8 engine; and four-door sedan was only body style.
Third generation (2003–2012): Frame and suspension redesigns and upgrades to improve handling. 2011 was the last model year for the North American Market and for Lincoln-Mercury models. A limited number of 2012 Crown Victorias were built for the police and overseas market

First generation (1978–1991)
For 1979, Ford introduced the Panther platform, downsizing the Ford LTD and Mercury Marquis model ranges.  Along with an extensive reduction in exterior footprint and weight, the Panther platform saw several other changes.  For the first time, the LTD and Marquis shared a common wheelbase; with the exception of grilles and taillights, the two model lines shared nearly identical bodywork.  As before, two-door, four-door, and station wagon bodies were offered.

For 1980, federal fuel-economy regulations forced the Lincoln Continental to adopt the Panther platform.  While built on its own wheelbase and using its own bodywork, the Continental, Town Car, and Continental Mark VI used the same powertrain as the LTD and Marquis.

Following the introduction of the Panther platform, Ford underwent an extensive revision of both its full-size and mid-size model ranges in the early 1980s.  For 1981, Lincoln made the Town Car and four-door Continental Mark VI its full-size model line to reduce its model overlap, with the Continental later becoming a mid-size sedan (based on the Fox platform); the two-door version of the Mark VI was replaced in 1984 by the Mark VII coupe.  For 1983, the Ford LTD and Mercury Marquis became mid-size sedans, replacing the Ford Granada and Mercury Cougar while the LTD Crown Victoria and Mercury Grand Marquis became distinct model lines, in an effort to move full-size model ranges upward in prestige.

The first generation of the Panther platform is the sole generation produced in multiple body styles.  1981 was the sole year for the Town Car coupe with the two-door version of the Mark VI ending production after 1983.  After 1987, two-door Ford and Mercury sedans were discontinued due to low demand.  After 1991, the Ford LTD Country Squire and Mercury Colony Park station wagons were discontinued.

Changes

Outside of the shift of nameplates in the early 1980s, few fundamental changes were made to first-generation Panther-platform vehicles from 1979 to 1991.  For 1980, Lincoln introduced the AOD 4-speed overdrive automatic transmission and fuel injection for the 5.0L V8, becoming available for Ford and Mercury in 1981 (Canadian Lincolns got fuel injection only in 1984).

For 1988, the LTD Crown Victoria and Grand Marquis underwent a minor revision to improve exterior aerodynamics.  For 1990, the Panther platform received its first addition of SRS airbags.  The Town Car (shifting to the second generation) was designed with dual airbags; the LTD Crown Victoria, Grand Marquis, and station wagons were fitted with driver-side airbags.

The 1st-generation Panther was also:
The last American car with functional vent windows (option on 1989 Ford/Mercury)
The last American-brand car available with a carbureted engine (351 cubic-inch V8; option on Grand Marquis, Crown Victoria wagon/police car through 1991)

Second generation (1990–2002)
The American automotive landscape had changed significantly throughout the 1980s, although Ford had left the Panther platform essentially unchanged. A combination of changing consumer tastes as well as increasingly more stringent fuel economy standards forced Ford to make significant changes to the Panther cars in order to keep them in production. Bucking industry trends of the time, Ford chose not to downsize it any further or to replace it entirely with a front-wheel drive platform, opting instead for more aerodynamic bodystyling (which had been popularized by the smaller Taurus) and an all-new powertrain. As a result of changing market trends towards minivans and sport utility vehicles, one casualty of the redesign was the Country Squire and Colony Park station wagons; at the time, their de facto replacement was the Ford Aerostar.

In October 1989, Lincoln introduced the second-generation Town Car. In early 1991, the Crown Victoria (the LTD prefix disappeared) and Grand Marquis received total redesigns of their bodies for 1992. The Ford was restyled to have more of a family resemblance to the Ford Taurus, while the Mercury was styled as a more contemporary version of its predecessor (a formal family sedan).

4.6-liter "Modular" V8
In 1991, the 4.6L SOHC Modular V8 debuted under the hood of the Lincoln Town Car. It was the replacement for both the 302 and 351 cubic-inch Windsor V8 engines; in 1992, it became available in the Crown Victoria and Grand Marquis. Although the torque peak for the Modular V8 was 1,200 rpm higher than for the 302 V8, the 4.6L was available with up to 60 more hp (with optional dual exhaust).

1998 upgrades
In 1997, Ford significantly upgraded the exterior designs of all three Panther platform cars. The Town Car received the most extensive changes with its entire body being restyled. To increase parts commonality between the two, the Crown Victoria was redesigned to share the rear roofline (and much of the exterior sheetmetal) with the Grand Marquis, which saw minor cosmetic changes itself. Underneath the sheetmetal, a Watt's linkage was added to the rear suspension (still a live rear axle) in an effort to improve handling.

Third generation (2003–2011)
For 2003, Ford Chassis Engineer Trever Skilnick completely redesigned the frame of the Panther platform using a hydroformed steel frame and a bolt-in cast aluminum stressed member that held the powertrain.  The front and rear suspension were also completely overhauled in an effort to improve handling; rack and pinion steering replaced the recirculating-ball design.  While the sheetmetal of the Crown Victoria was left alone, the Grand Marquis and Town Car both received updates to the exterior and interior in an effort to bring them in line with the rest of their respective product lineups.  The "Cast Aluminum #2" frame crossmember won Casting of The Year for Tier 1 supplier CMI - Hayes Lemmerz, and the new chassis was reviewed favorably by journalist Dan Neil of the Wall Street Journal .

For 2003, Mercury introduced the Marauder, a high-performance variant of the Grand Marquis.  Designed in a similar fashion as the 1994–1996 Chevrolet Impala SS (with black also being its most commonly available paint color), it featured the engine of the Ford Mustang Mach 1.  The Marauder sold poorly; it was dropped after 2004 after just over 11,000 were built.

Models
In total, twelve vehicle nameplates were produced under the Panther platform, with the Ford LTD Crown Victoria, Ford Crown Victoria, Ford Crown Victoria Police Interceptor, Lincoln Town Car, and Continental Mark VI produced exclusively on the architecture.

Variants

The Presidential State Car built for President George H. W. Bush is based upon a 1989 Lincoln Town Car.
In line with predecessors, the vehicle is equipped with armor plating, bulletproof glass, and undisclosed security modifications.
To accommodate its higher weight, the vehicle was fitted with a 7.5L V8 (and E4OD transmission) from a F-250 ¾-ton pickup truck.
The 1993 Aston Martin Lagonda Vignale concept car used a modified Lincoln Town Car chassis and 4.6L V8.
Two license-built variants of the Lincoln Town Car were assembled by the Chinese automaker Hongqi.
During the mid-1990s, the Hongqi CA 7465 was a stretch limousine derived from the 1990-1997 Town Car; the front fascia was styled in line to the 1970s CA770.  Approximately 100 were built. 
The 1998-2005 Hongqi CA7460(红旗CA7460) and Hongqi Qijian(红旗旗舰) (flagship) were luxury sedans produced primarily for government and military officials.  After initial assembly by Ford in the United States, the cars were shipped to China for final bodywork.
In 2002, Mercury introduced a Mercury Marauder concept car, serving as a preview of the 2003 production vehicle.  While the production Marauder was a 4-door sedan, the concept car was a 2-door (topless) convertible.  Beginning life as a 1999 Ford Crown Victoria, the concept car was the first full-size convertible from Ford Motor Company since 1971.

Discontinuation
Following the 2003 chassis redesign of the Panther platform, during most of the 2000s, Ford Motor Company began consideration of design efforts towards a rear-wheel drive successor to the chassis architecture.  Intended for release by the end of the 2000s, an all-new platform would be the first truly new rear-wheel drive full-size chassis from Ford in three decades; another key objective was to consolidate the Panther chassis and the slightly smaller EA169 platform of Ford Australia (underpinning the Ford Falcon sedan and Ford Territory wagon, with the long-wheelbase Ford Fairlane/LTD nearly matching the Crown Victoria/Grand Marquis in wheelbase).  During the mid-2000s, Ford debuted several concept vehicles (Ford 427, Lincoln MKR, and Ford Interceptor), previewing potential designs of rear-wheel drive Ford and Lincoln-Mercury full-size sedans.  While none of the concept vehicles reached production in their entirety, design elements of each vehicle appeared in multiple Ford and Lincoln sedans.

For the 2005 model year, Ford introduced its first front-wheel drive full-size chassis, the Ford D3 platform.  Derived from a Volvo chassis architecture, the D3 chassis underpinned the Ford Five Hundred and Mercury Montego.  While the latter was sold alongside the larger Grand Marquis, the Five Hundred was phased in as a replacement for both the Ford Taurus and Crown Victoria.  By 2007, the Crown Victoria was supported nearly entirely by fleet sales, outselling only the Ford GT in retail sales.

After the 2007 model year, Ford ended retail sales of the Crown Victoria, with the Five Hundred renamed as the Ford Taurus; further retail sales were adopted by Lincoln-Mercury.  As part of The Way Forward, Lincoln Town Car production shifted from Wixom Assembly and was consolidated with Ford and Mercury at St. Thomas Assembly in Canada.

In January 2009, Ford announced that design efforts towards its global rear-wheel drive platform were canceled.  The same year, Ford announced that 2011 marked the final year of the Crown Victoria Police Interceptor, with production of a successor to follow for 2012.  2011 would slowly mark the phaseout of both Panther-platform production and of vehicle production at St. Thomas Assembly.  On January 4, the final Grand Marquis rolled off the assembly line, becoming the final Mercury vehicle ever produced.  During August, the final Lincoln Town Car rolled off the assembly line.

For the 2012 model year, all Crown Victorias were produced for export; as the vehicle was not produced with stability control, it was no longer legal for sale in the United States or Canada.  A short run of Crown Victorias were produced for GCC export (Middle East); intended for export to Saudi Arabia, the final Ford Crown Victoria rolled off the assembly line on September 15, 2011, ending production at St. Thomas Assembly.

While the closure of the Mercury division would leave the Grand Marquis without a direct successor, by the end of production, Ford introduced functional replacements for the Crown Victoria/Police Interceptor and Lincoln Town Car (in the sixth-generation Ford Taurus/Police Interceptor Sedan and Lincoln MKS, respectively).  With the exception of the Police Interceptor Sedan, sales of the Taurus and MKS shifted from a high dependence on fleet customers to a higher proportion of retail sales.  The Lincoln Town Car name made its return for livery customers, with Lincoln developing a livery/limousine variant of the Lincoln MKT with the MKT Town Car name.

As of current production, the Ford division no longer produces full-size sedans, with the Ford Fusion (Mondeo) serving as the largest Ford-brand sedan; the Lincoln Continental is now the sole full-size sedan produced by Ford Motor Company in North America.

References 

 
Panther
1970s cars
1980s cars
1990s cars
2000s cars
2010s cars